This is a list of places in China which have standing links to local communities in other countries known as "town twinning" (usually in Europe) or "sister cities" (usually in the rest of the world).

A
Anguo

 Dongdaemun (Seoul), South Korea
 Kushima, Japan

Anqing

 Calabasas, United States
 Cheboksary, Russia
 Ibaraki, Japan
 Kütahya, Turkey

Anshan

 Ansan, South Korea
 Birmingham, United States
 Bursa, Turkey
 Holon, Israel
 Lipetsk, Russia
 Sheffield, England, United Kingdom

B
Baoding

 Charlotte, United States
 Hafnarfjörður, Iceland
 Saijō, Japan
 Santiago de Veraguas, Panama
 Sønderborg, Denmark
 Yonago, Japan

Baotou

 Mbombela, South Africa
 Orkhon, Mongolia

Beihai

 Gold Coast, Australia
 Hat Yai, Thailand
 Imatra, Finland
 Jablonec nad Nisou, Czech Republic
 Kep, Cambodia
 Leduc, Canada
 Leduc County, Canada
 Lugano, Switzerland
 Puerto Princesa, Philippines
 Semarang, Indonesia
 Suva, Fiji
 Tulsa, United States
 Yatsushiro, Japan

Beijing

 Addis Ababa, Ethiopia
 Ankara, Turkey
 Astana, Kazakhstan
 Athens, Greece
 Bangkok, Thailand
 Berlin, Germany
 Brussels, Belgium
 Bucharest, Romania
 Budapest, Hungary
 Buenos Aires, Argentina
 Cairo, Egypt
 Canberra, Australia
 Cologne, Germany
 Copenhagen, Denmark
 Delhi, India
 Doha, Qatar
 Dublin, Ireland
 Gauteng, South Africa
 Hanoi, Vietnam
 Havana, Cuba
 Île-de-France, France
 Islamabad, Pakistan
 Jakarta, Indonesia
 Kyiv, Ukraine
 Lima, Peru
 London, England, United Kingdom
 Manila, Philippines
 Minsk, Belarus
 Mexico City, Mexico
 Moscow, Russia
 New South Wales, Australia
 New York City, United States
 Ottawa, Canada
 Phnom Penh, Cambodia
 Riga, Latvia
 Rio de Janeiro, Brazil
 San José, Costa Rica
 Santiago, Chile
 Seoul, South Korea
 Tehran, Iran
 Tel Aviv, Israel
 Tirana, Albania
 Tokyo, Japan
 Ulaanbaatar, Mongolia
 Vientiane, Laos
 Washington D.C., United States
 Wellington, New Zealand

Bengbu

 Barra Mansa, Brazil
 Bergamo, Italy
 Settsu, Japan
 Szolnok, Hungary
 Tameside, England, United Kingdom

Bozhou

 Cognac, France
 Kyōtango, Japan
 Quevedo, Ecuador
 Shimanto, Japan

 Vinhedo, Brazil
 Witzenberg, South Africa
 Yeongju, South Korea

C
Changchun

 Chongjin, North Korea
 Hjørring, Denmark
 Krasnoyarsk, Russia
 Little Rock, United States
 Masterton, New Zealand
 Minsk, Belarus
 Novi Sad, Serbia
 Plovdiv, Bulgaria
 Prachinburi, Thailand
 Sendai, Japan
 Tijuana, Mexico
 Ulan-Ude, Russia
 Ulsan, South Korea
 Warrnambool, Australia
 Windsor, Canada
 Žilina, Slovakia

Changji
 Barnaul, Russia

Changsha

 Brazzaville, Congo
 Gumi, South Korea
 Kagoshima, Japan
 Mogilev, Belarus
 Mons, Belgium
 New Haven, United States
 Ölfus, Iceland
 Saint Paul, United States
 Sol Plaatje, South Africa
 Ulyanovsk, Russia

Changshu

 Ayabe, Japan

 Essaouira, Morocco
 Satsumasendai, Japan
 Townsville, Australia
 Whittier, United States

Changzhou

 Beau Bassin-Rose Hill, Mauritius
 Buffalo, United States
 Caxias do Sul, Brazil
 Curitiba, Brazil
 Dar es Salaam, Tanzania
 Eskişehir, Turkey
 Essen, Germany
 Georges River, Australia
 Jelenia Góra, Poland
 Johor Bahru, Malaysia
 Minden, Germany
 Namyangju, South Korea
 Niagara Falls, Canada
 Prato, Italy
 Rockford, United States
 Satakunta, Finland
 La Serena, Chile
 Solihull, England, United Kingdom
 Stavropol, Russia
 Tapachula, Mexico
 Takatsuki, Japan
 Tilburg, Netherlands
 Tokorozawa, Japan
 Torrington, United States
 Wyndham, Australia

Chaohu

 Dole, France
 Pergamino, Argentina

Chengdu

 Bangalore, India
 Bonn, Germany
 Chiang Mai, Thailand
 Daegu, South Korea
 Fez, Morocco
 Fingal, Ireland
 Flemish Brabant, Belgium
 Gimcheon, South Korea
 Gold Coast, Australia
 Gomel, Belarus
 Haifa, Israel
 Hamilton, New Zealand
 Honolulu, United States
 Horsens, Denmark
 Ibagué, Colombia
 Kathmandu, Nepal
 Kōfu, Japan
 Lahore, Pakistan
 Linz, Austria
 Ljubljana, Slovenia
 Łódź, Poland
 Luang Prabang, Laos
 Maastricht, Netherlands
 Maputo, Mozambique
 Mechelen, Belgium
 Medan, Indonesia
 Montpellier, France
 Nashville, United States
 Palermo, Italy
 Perth, Australia
 Phoenix, United States
 La Plata, Argentina
 Recife, Brazil
 Sheffield, England, United Kingdom
 Volgograd, Russia
 Winnipeg, Canada
 Zapopan, Mexico

Chenzhou
 Laredo, United States

Chizhou

 Cumberland, Australia
 Florencio Varela, Argentina
 Gurye, South Korea
 Svenljunga, Sweden

Chongqing

 Antwerp Province, Belgium
 Aswan, Egypt
 Bangkok, Thailand
 Brisbane, Australia
 Chennai, India
 Chiang Mai, Thailand
 Córdoba Province, Argentina
 Detroit, United States
 Düsseldorf, Germany
 Gers, France
 Hiroshima, Japan
 Incheon, South Korea
 Leicester, England, United Kingdom
 Maribor, Slovenia
 Mpumalanga, South Africa
 Pest County, Hungary
 Phnom Penh, Cambodia
 Pitești, Romania
 Seattle, United States
 Shiraz, Iran
 Sliven, Bulgaria
 Toronto, Canada
 Toulouse, France
 Vladimir, Russia
 Voronezh, Russia
 Zaporizhzhia Oblast, Ukraine

Chongqing – Nanchuan
 Linden, Guyana

Cixi

 Bayside, Australia
 Bakersfield, United States

D
Dalian

 Bremen, Germany
 Cape Breton, Canada
 Enschede, Netherlands
 Glasgow, Scotland, United Kingdom
 Kitakyushu, Japan
 Le Havre, France
 Maizuru, Japan

 Oakland, United States
 Pointe-Noire, Congo
 Rostock, Germany
 Vladivostok, Russia

Dandong
 Wilmington, United States

Daqing

 Calgary, Canada
 Charters Towers, Australia
 East London, South Africa
 Quatre Bornes, Mauritius
 Tyumen, Russia

Datong

 Bury, England, United Kingdom
 Ōmuta, Japan

Deqing

 Monticello, United States
 Valls, Spain

Deyang

 Gangneung, South Korea
 Higashihiroshima, Japan
 Konin, Poland 
 Lahti, Finland
 Muncie, United States
 Siegen-Wittgenstein (district), Germany

Dujiangyan

 Ähtäri, Finland
 Borna, Germany
 Chūō, Japan
 Gisors-Epte-Lévrière (intercommunality), France
 Kai, Japan
 Minami-Alps, Japan
 Ōtake, Japan
 Shōwa, Japan

Dunhuang

 Aurangabad, India
 Kamakura, Japan
 Namhae, South Korea

E
Emeishan
 Kashiwazaki, Japan

F
Foshan

 Ingolstadt, Germany
 Itami, Japan
 Naro-Fominsky District, Russia
 Port Louis, Mauritius
 Port Vila, Vanuatu
 La Possession, Réunion, France
 St. George's, Grenada
 Starogard Gdański, Poland
 Stockton, United States
 Townsville, Australia

Fuzhou

 Campinas, Brazil
 Georgetown, Guyana
 Hạ Long, Vietnam

 Honolulu, United States
 Koszalin, Poland
 Liège, Belgium
 Manila, Philippines
 Mombasa, Kenya
 Nagasaki, Japan
 Naha, Japan
 Nouadhibou, Mauritania
 Omsk, Russia
 Río Gallegos, Argentina
 Semarang, Indonesia
 Shoalhaven, Australia
 Siem Reap, Cambodia
 Syracuse, United States
 Tacoma, United States

G
Guang'an

 Boulogne-Billancourt, France
 Gumi, South Korea

Guanghan
 Auburn, United States

Guangzhou

 Ahmedabad, India
 Arequipa, Peru
 Auckland, New Zealand
 Bangkok, Thailand
 Bari, Italy
 Birmingham, England, United Kingdom
 Bristol, England, United Kingdom
 Dubai, United Arab Emirates
 Durban, South Africa
 Frankfurt am Main, Germany
 Fukuoka, Japan
 Gwangju, South Korea
 Hambantota, Sri Lanka
 Harare, Zimbabwe
 Istanbul, Turkey
 Kazan, Russia
 Kuwait City, Kuwait

 Łódź, Poland
 Los Angeles, United States
 Lyon, France
 Manila, Philippines
 Mombasa, Kenya
 Noboribetsu, Japan
 Pokhara, Nepal
 Quito, Ecuador
 Rabat, Morocco
 Recife, Brazil
 San José, Costa Rica
 Santiago, Chile
 Surabaya, Indonesia
 Sydney, Australia
 Tampere, Finland
 Valencia, Spain
 Vancouver, Canada
 Vilnius, Lithuania
 Yekaterinburg, Russia

Guilin

 Hạ Long, Vietnam
 Hastings, New Zealand
 Hévíz, Hungary
 Jeju City, South Korea
 Kakogawa, Japan
 Kumamoto, Japan
 Muratpaşa, Turkey
 Orlando, United States
 Târgoviște, Romania
 Toruń, Poland

Guiyang

 Fort Worth, United States
 Meath, Ireland
 Palmerston North, New Zealand
 Rio de Janeiro, Brazil
 Vicenza, Italy

H
Haikou

 Åland, Finland
 Antalya, Turkey
 Chornomorsk, Russia
 Darwin, Australia
 Donghae, South Korea
 Faiyum, Egypt
 Faro, Portugal
 Gdynia, Poland
 Haeundae (Busan), South Korea
 Honolulu, United States
 Islamabad, Pakistan
 Krabi, Thailand
 Lahore, Pakistan
 Malacca City, Malaysia
 Modi'in-Maccabim-Re'ut, Israel
 Nanaimo, Canada
 Oklahoma City, United States
 Perth, Scotland, United Kingdom
 Pisa Province, Italy
 Qazvin, Iran
 Scottsdale, United States
 Tagaytay, Philippines
 Ulaanbaatar, Mongolia
 Victoria, Seychelles
 Vladimir, Russia
 Waterford, Ireland
 Whangarei, New Zealand
 Yangon, Myanmar
 Zanzibar City, Tanzania

Hami
 Nyūzen, Japan

Handan

 Dubuque, United States
 Inari, Finland
 Padua, Italy
 Saiki, Japan

Hangzhou

 Agadir, Morocco
 Baguio, Philippines
 Beit Shemesh, Israel
 Benito Juárez, Mexico
 Boston, United States
 El Calafate, Argentina
 Cape Town, South Africa
 Curitiba, Brazil
 Dresden, Germany
 Fukui, Japan
 Gifu, Japan
 Greenwich, United States
 Hamamatsu, Japan
 Heidelberg, Germany
 Indianapolis, United States
 Kazan, Russia
 Kota Kinabalu, Malaysia
 Leeds, England, United Kingdom
 Lugano, Switzerland
 Maribor, Slovenia
 Montego Bay, Jamaica
 Nadi, Fiji
 Nice, France
 Oviedo, Spain
 Oulu, Finland
 Paramaribo, Surinam
 Pisa, Italy
 Queenstown-Lakes, New Zealand
 Seogwipo, South Korea
 Split, Croatia
 Yeosu, South Korea

Hangzhou – Fuyang
 Riverbank, United States

Hangzhou – Xiaoshan
 Yamanashi, Japan

Harbin

 Aarhus, Denmark
 Arras (communauté), France
 Asahikawa, Japan
 Bucheon, South Korea
 Cagayan de Oro, Philippines
 Chalandri, Greece
 Chiang Mai, Thailand
 Daugavpils, Latvia
 Edmonton, Canada
 Ekurhuleni, South Africa
 Erzurum, Turkey
 Fairfax County, United States
 Givatayim, Israel
 Gomel, Belarus
 Griffith, Australia
 Khabarovsk, Russia
 Krasnodar, Russia
 Magdeburg, Germany
 Minneapolis, United States
 Murmansk, Russia
 Niigata, Japan
 Nyíregyháza, Hungary
 Ploiești, Romania
 Punta Arenas, Chile
 Riccione, Italy
 Rokiškis, Lithuania
 Rovaniemi, Finland
 Salvador, Brazil
 South Taranaki, New Zealand
 Sunderland, England, United Kingdom
 Sverdlovsk Oblast, Russia
 Užice, Serbia
 Vitebsk, Belarus
 Vladivostok, Russia
 Wiener Neustadt, Austria
 Yakutsk, Russia

Harbin – Daoli
 Pervouralsk, Russia

Hefei

 Aalborg, Denmark
 Belfast, Northern Ireland, United Kingdom
 Bujumbura, Burundi
 Columbus, United States
 Darebin, Australia
 Freetown, Sierra Leone
 Kurume, Japan
 Lleida, Spain
 Nizhny Novgorod, Russia
 Osnabrück, Germany
 Phnom Penh, Cambodia
 Ufa, Russia
 Wonju, South Korea

Hegang
 Birobidzhan, Russia

Heihe

 Blagoveshchensk, Russia
 Krasnoyarsk, Russia
 Yakutsk, Russia

Huai'an

 Cuenca, Ecuador
 Gomel, Belarus
 Kolpino (Saint Petersburg), Russia

 Magnitogorsk, Russia
 Oakville, Canada
 Płock, Poland
 Sassnitz, Germany

 Wanju, South Korea
 Yorba Linda, United States

Huaibei

 Ruse, Bulgaria
 Ub, Serbia

Huainan

 Barra Mansa, Brazil
 Bergamo, Italy
 Settsu, Japan
 Szolnok, Hungary
 Tameside, England, United Kingdom

Huangshan

 Dong (Daegu), South Korea
 Fujiidera, Japan
 Interlaken, Switzerland
 Serravalle, San Marino
 Stralsund, Germany
 Vara, Sweden

Huizhou

 Milpitas, United States
 North Vancouver, Canada

Hulunbuir

 Chita, Russia
 Ulan-Ude, Russia

Hulunbuir – Hailar

 Chinggis City, Mongolia
 Chita, Russia

J
Jiamusi

 Avellino Province, Italy
 Donghae, South Korea
 Komsomolsk-on-Amur, Russia
 Nirasaki, Japan
 Shoalhaven, Australia

Jiangmen

 Kota Kinabalu, Malaysia
 Lautoka, Fiji
 Maia, Portugal
 Riverside, United States

Jiangyin

 Alameda, United States
 Belo Horizonte, Brazil
 Faaa, French Polynesia
 Fujioka, Japan

Jiaxing

 Bunbury, Australia
 Fuji, Japan
 Gangneung, South Korea
 Halle, Germany
 Imatra, Finland
 Rebild, Denmark

Jilin City

 Mangyongdae (Pyongyang), North Korea
 Matsue, Japan
 Nakhodka, Russia
 Prince Albert, Canada
 Spokane, United States
 Volgograd, Russia
 Yamagata, Japan

Jinan

 Arba Minch, Ethiopia
 Augsburg, Germany
 Civitavecchia, Italy
 Coventry, England, United Kingdom
 Joondalup, Australia
 Kazanlak, Bulgaria
 Kfar Saba, Israel
 Kharkiv, Ukraine
 Marmaris, Turkey
 Nagpur, India
 Nizhny Novgorod, Russia
 Port Moresby, Papua New Guinea
 Porto Velho, Brazil
 Praia, Cape Verde
 Regina, Canada
 Rennes, France
 Sacramento, United States
 Sidoarjo, Indonesia
 Suwon, South Korea
 Vantaa, Finland
 Vitebsk, Belarus
 Wakayama, Japan
 Yamaguchi, Japan
 Zapopan, Mexico

Jining

 Angra do Heroísmo, Portugal
 Ashikaga, Japan
 Komatsu, Japan
 Lahore, Pakistan
 Mulhouse, France
 Nonsan, South Korea
 Osasco, Brazil
 Passi, Philippines
 Springfield, United States
 Seo (Busan), South Korea
 Suseong (Daegu), South Korea
 Taganrog, Russia
 Tete, Mozambique
 Tokmok, Kyrgyzstan
 Yeongju, South Korea

Jiujiang

 Baw Baw, Australia
 Chios, Greece
 Jeongseon, South Korea
 Kajaani, Finland
 Koper, Slovenia
 Legionowo, Poland
 Louisville, United States
 La Plata, Argentina
 Queimados, Brazil
 Redbridge, England, United Kingdom
 Savannah, United States
 Serowe, Botswana
 Tamano, Japan

Jixi

 Novosibirsky District, Russia
 Samcheok, South Korea

K
Kaifeng

 Florida, Uruguay
 Kiryat Motzkin, Israel
 Omsk, Russia
 Toda, Japan
 Wichita, United States
 Wingecarribee, Australia
 Yeongcheon, South Korea

Kaili

 Kartuzy, Poland
 Karviná, Czech Republic

Karamay

 Aktobe, Kazakhstan
 Iskitim, Russia

Kashgar

 Abbottabad, Pakistan
 Gorno-Badakhshan, Tajikistan
 Osh Region, Kyrgyzstan

Kunming

 Antalya, Turkey
 Chefchaouen, Morocco
 Chiang Mai, Thailand
 Chittagong, Bangladesh
 Cochabamba, Bolivia
 Da Nang, Vietnam
 Denver, United States
 Dietzenbach, Germany
 Fujisawa, Japan

 Kolkata, India
 Kuching, Malaysia
 Mandalay, Myanmar
 Nairobi, Kenya
 Nancy, France
 New Plymouth, New Zealand
 Olomouc, Czech Republic
 Phnom Penh, Cambodia
 Pokhara, Nepal
 Polonnaruwa, Sri Lanka
 Schenectady, United States
 Takayama, Japan
 Vientiane, Laos
 Wagga Wagga, Australia
 Yangon, Myanmar
 Zürich, Switzerland

Kunshan

 Grootfontein, Namibia
 Hyvinkää, Finland

 South El Monte, United States
 Tatebayashi, Japan

L
Lanzhou

 Akita, Japan
 Alba Iulia, Romania
 Albay, Philippines
 Albuquerque, United States
 Ashgabat, Turkmenistan
 Chorley, England, United Kingdom
 Fier, Albania
 Hilltops, Australia
 Leskovac, Serbia
 Nouakchott, Mauritania
 Osh, Kyrgyzstan
 Penza, Russia
 Tsumeb, Namibia
 Ulan-Ude, Russia

Leshan

 Fraser Coast, Australia
 Gilbert, United States
 Ichikawa, Japan
 Issy-les-Moulineaux, France
 Prachuap Khiri Khan, Thailand

Lhasa

 Boulder, United States
 Elista, Russia
 Kathmandu, Nepal

Lianyungang

 Bishkek, Kyrgyzstan
 Greater Geelong, Australia
 Mokpo, South Korea
 Napier, New Zealand
 Sabadell, Spain
 Saga, Japan
 Sakai, Japan
 Volzhsky, Russia

Lijiang

 Greater Shepparton, Australia
 Malibu, United States
 New Westminster, Canada
 Roanoke, United States
 Takayama, Japan
 Zermatt, Switzerland

Lishui
 Mishima, Japan

Liuzhou

 Bandung, Indonesia
 Cincinnati, United States
 Dar es Salaam, Tanzania
 Muntinlupa, Philippines
 N'Djamena, Chad
 Passau, Germany
 Rayong, Thailand
 Stalowa Wola, Poland
 Vĩnh Yên, Vietnam

Lu'an
 Varkaus, Finland

Luoyang

 Alcalá de Henares, Spain
 Buyeo, South Korea

 Kashihara, Japan
 La Crosse, United States
 Okayama, Japan
 Sukagawa, Japan
 Tolyatti, Russia
 Tours, France

Luzhou

 Herne, Germany
 Kabwe, Zambia

M
Ma'anshan

 Arganda del Rey, Spain
 Changwon, South Korea
 Galesburg, United States

 Hamilton, Canada
 Isesaki, Japan
 Tlalnepantla de Baz, Mexico
 Zapala, Argentina

Macau

 Coimbra, Portugal
 Linköping, Sweden
 Lisbon, Portugal
 Porto, Portugal
 Praia, Cape Verde
 São Paulo, Brazil

Meishan

 Klin, Russia
 Nizhnekamsk, Russia

Mianyang

 Novosibirsk, Russia
 Obninsk, Russia
 Shōbara, Japan

Mingguang
 Sainte-Adèle, Canada

Mudanjiang

 Jyväskylä, Finland
 Ōtsu, Japan
 Paju, South Korea
 Ussuriysk, Russia

N
Nanchang

 Albacete, Spain
 Kutaisi, Georgia
 Lincoln, England, United Kingdom
 Newcastle, South Africa
 Olympia, United States
 Quilmes, Argentina
 Skopje, North Macedonia
 Sorocaba, Brazil
 Takamatsu, Japan
 Toluca, Mexico
 Ufa, Russia
 Valkeakoski, Finland

Nanchong
 Toledo, United States

Nanjing

 Bandar Seri Begawan, Brunei
 Barranquilla, Colombia
 Bloemfontein, South Africa
 Concepción, Chile
 Daejeon, South Korea
 Eindhoven, Netherlands
 Florence, Italy
 Leipzig, Germany
 Limassol, Cyprus
 London, Canada
 Lusaka, Zambia
 Malacca City, Malaysia
 Mexicali, Mexico
 Mogilev, Belarus

 Perth, Australia
 Shiraz, Iran
 St. Louis, United States
 Windhoek, Namibia
 Yaroslavl, Russia
 York, England, United Kingdom

Nanning

 Antananarivo, Madagascar
 Banjul, Gambia
 Bogor, Indonesia
 Bundaberg, Australia
 Champasak, Laos
 Commerce City, United States
 Crema, Italy
 Davao City, Philippines
 Grudziądz, Poland
 Gwacheon, South Korea
 Haiphong, Vietnam
 Iquique, Chile
 Ivano-Frankivsk, Ukraine
 Khon Kaen, Thailand
 Klagenfurt, Austria

 Lilongwe, Malawi
 Provo, United States
 Sihanoukville, Cambodia
 Val-de-Marne, France

 Yangon, Myanmar

Ningbo

 Aachen, Germany
 Cluj-Napoca, Romania
 Daegu, South Korea
 Bydgoszcz, Poland
 Marrakesh, Morocco
 Nagaokakyō, Japan
 Nelson Mandela Bay, South Africa
 Nottingham, England, United Kingdom
 Prijedor, Bosnia and Herzegovina
 Rouen, France
 Santos, Brazil
 Varna, Bulgaria
 Ventspils, Latvia
 Victoria de Durango, Mexico
 Wilmington, United States

P
Pengzhou

 Ipswich, Australia
 Ishikari, Japan
 Mürzzuschlag, Austria

Pinghu
 Watsonville, United States

Q
Qingdao

 Acapulco, Mexico
 Adelaide, Australia
 Antalya, Turkey
 Bilbao, Spain
 Daegu, South Korea
 Dushanbe, Tajikistan
 Faisalabad, Pakistan
 Frederikshavn, Denmark
 Grand Port, Mauritius
 Hyderabad, India
 Iloilo City, Philippines
 Long Beach, United States
 Makassar, Indonesia
 Mannheim, Germany
 Nantes, France
 Ness Ziona, Israel
 Odesa, Ukraine
 Oldenburg, Germany
 Orsha, Belarus
 Paderborn, Germany
 Pattaya, Thailand
 Perm, Russia
 Puerto Montt, Chile
 Ramat Gan, Israel
 Regensburg, Germany
 Rijeka, Croatia
 Saint Petersburg, Russia
 Salo, Finland
 Shimonoseki, Japan
 Southampton, England, United Kingdom
 Thousand Oaks, United States
 Velsen, Netherlands
 Vigo, Spain
 Vila Velha, Brazil

Qiqihar

 Goyang, South Korea
 Mariupol, Ukraine
 New Castle County, United States
 Ufa, Russia
 Utsunomiya, Japan

Qitaihe

 Artyom, Russia
 Jeungpyeong, South Korea

Quanzhou

 Hérault, France
 Holbæk, Denmark
 Kuching, Malaysia
 Maykop, Russia
 Monterey Park, United States
 Neustadt an der Weinstraße, Germany
 Urasoe, Japan

Quzhou

 Red Wing, United States
 Sano, Japan
 Sumgait, Azerbaijan

S
Sanmenxia

 Dongducheon, South Korea
 Kitakami, Japan
 Kostroma, Russia
 Murray Bridge, Australia

 Szolnok, Hungary
 Zabok, Croatia

Sanya

 Alhambra, United States
 Benito Juárez, Mexico
 Blackpool, England, United Kingdom
 Cannes, France
 Dubrovnik, Croatia
 Khabarovsk, Russia
 Kuusamo, Finland
 Lapu-Lapu, Philippines
 Maui County, United States
 Sal, Cape Verde

 Viareggio, Italy
 Yalta, Ukraine

Shanghai

 Aden, Yemen
 Alexandria, Egypt
 Antwerp, Belgium
 Auvergne-Rhône-Alpes, France
 Bangkok, Thailand
 Barcelona, Spain
 Basel, Switzerland
 Belgrade, Serbia
 Bratislava Region, Slovakia
 Budapest, Hungary
 Busan, South Korea
 Casablanca, Morocco
 Central Denmark Region, Denmark
 Colombo, Sri Lanka
 Constanța, Romania
 Cork, Ireland
 Chiang Mai Province, Thailand
 Chicago, United States
 Dubai, United Arab Emirates
 Dunedin, New Zealand
 East Java, Indonesia
 Espoo, Finland
 Guayaquil, Ecuador
 Haifa, Israel
 Hamburg, Germany
 Hamhung, North Korea
 Ho Chi Minh City, Vietnam
 Houston, United States
 Istanbul, Turkey
 Jakarta, Indonesia
 Jalisco, Mexico
 Karachi, Pakistan
 KwaZulu-Natal, South Africa
 Lima, Peru
 Liverpool, England, United Kingdom
 London, England, United Kingdom
 Maputo, Mozambique
 Marseille, France
 Metro Manila, Philippines
 Milan, Italy
 Minsk, Belarus
 Montreal, Canada
 Mumbai, India
 Osaka, Japan
 Osaka Prefecture, Japan
 Phnom Penh, Cambodia
 Piraeus, Greece
 Pomeranian Voivodeship, Poland
 Port Vila, Vanuatu
 Porto, Portugal
 Quebec, Canada
 Queensland, Australia
 Rosario, Argentina
 Rotterdam, Netherlands
 Saint Petersburg, Russia
 Salzburg, Austria
 San Francisco, United States
 Santiago de Cuba Province, Cuba
 São Paulo, Brazil
 Sofia, Bulgaria
 Tabriz, Iran
 Tashkent, Uzbekistan
 Valparaíso, Chile
 Windhoek, Namibia
 Yokohama, Japan
 Zagreb, Croatia

Shantou

 Cần Thơ, Vietnam
 Haifa, Israel
 Kishiwada, Japan
 Saint John, Canada

Shaoxing

 Belém, Brazil
 Cape Girardeau, United States
 Fujinomiya, Japan
 Leninsky District, Russia
 Nishinomiya, Japan
 Odense, Denmark
 Suva, Fiji
 Yongsan (Seoul), South Korea

Shenyang

 Belfast, Northern Ireland, United Kingdom
 Chicago, United States
 Daejeon, South Korea

 Florida, Uruguay
 Incheon, South Korea
 Irkutsk, Russia
 Katowice, Poland
 Kawasaki, Japan
 Monterrey, Mexico
 Novosibirsk, Russia
 La Plata, Argentina
 Quezon City, Philippines
 Ramat Gan, Israel
 Sapporo, Japan
 Seongnam, South Korea

 Turin, Italy
 Ufa, Russia
 Yaoundé, Cameroon

Shenzhen

 Almere, Netherlands
 Apia, Samoa
 Canton of Bern, Switzerland
 Bishkek, Kyrgyzstan
 Brisbane, Australia
 Edinburgh, Scotland, United Kingdom
 Gwangyang, South Korea
 Haifa, Israel
 Houston, United States
 Kingston, Jamaica
 Lomé, Togo
 Luxor, Egypt
 Minsk, Belarus
 Nuremberg, Germany
 Phnom Penh, Cambodia
 Plovdiv, Bulgaria
 Porto, Portugal
 Poznań, Poland
 Tsukuba, Japan
 Walloon Brabant, Belgium

Shihezi

 East Gwillimbury, Canada
 Multan, Pakistan

Shijiazhuang

 Cheonan, South Korea
 Corby, England, United Kingdom
 Des Moines, United States
 Dire Dawa, Ethiopia
 Nagano, Japan
 Nagykanizsa, Hungary
 Osh, Kyrgyzstan
 Parma, Italy
 Querétaro, Mexico
 Richmond Hill, Canada
 Saskatoon, Canada

Shuangyashan

 Magadan, Russia
 Nagai, Japan

Suining
 Kırklareli, Turkey

Suzhou, Anhui
 Padang, Indonesia

Suzhou, Jiangsu

 Antananarivo, Madagascar
 Esbjerg, Denmark
 Grenoble, France
 Ikeda, Japan
 Ismailia, Egypt
 Jeonju, South Korea
 Kanazawa, Japan
 Konstanz, Germany
 Kronoberg County, Sweden
 Logan, Australia
 Malé, Maldives
 Nowy Sącz, Poland
 Pointe-Noire, Congo
 Portland, United States
 Porto Alegre, Brazil
 Riga, Latvia
 Taupo, New Zealand
 Tulcea County, Romania
 Venice, Italy
 Victoria, Canada
 West Flanders, Belgium
 Windhoek, Namibia

Suzhou – Gusu
 Santa Luċija, Malta

Suzhou – Wujiang

 Bourgoin-Jallieu, France
 Chiba, Japan
 Dubbo, Australia
 Hwaseong, South Korea
 Marlboro, United States
 Mogale, South Africa
 Südwestpfalz, Germany
 Uchinada, Japan

Suzhou – Wuzhong

 Riesa, Germany
 Rotorua Lakes, New Zealand
 Southlake, United States

T
Tacheng

 Oskemen, Kazakhstan
 Rubtsovsk, Russia

Taicang

 Jülich, Germany
 Rosolina, Italy
 Wirral, England, United Kingdom

Taiyuan

 Chemnitz, Germany
 Donetsk, Ukraine
 Douala, Cameroon
 Himeji, Japan
 Launceston, Australia
 Nashville, United States
 Newcastle upon Tyne, England, United Kingdom
 Saint-Denis, Réunion, France

 Suncheon, South Korea
 Syktyvkar, Russia

Taizhou, Jiangsu

 Arcadia, United States
 Barrie, Canada
 Broken Hill, Australia
 Eumseong, South Korea
 Hutt, New Zealand
 Kotka, Finland
 Latrobe, Australia
 Newport News, United States
 Pavia Province, Italy
 Zaragoza, Spain

Taizhou, Zhejiang

 Fort Wayne, United States
 Hanau, Germany
 Iquique, Chile
 Muan, South Korea
 Nevers, France
 Tsuruga, Japan

Tang
 Gravenhurst, Canada

Tianjin

 Abidjan, Ivory Coast
 Chiba, Japan
 East Java, Indonesia
 Groningen, Netherlands
 Haiphong, Vietnam
 Incheon, South Korea
 Islamabad, Pakistan
 İzmir, Turkey
 Jönköping, Sweden
 Kharkiv, Ukraine
 Kobe, Japan
 Lahore, Pakistan
 Łódź, Poland
 Lombardy, Italy
 Melbourne, Australia
 Métropole Rouen Normandie, France
 Nord-Pas-de-Calais, France
 Orange County, United States
 Philadelphia, United States
 Plovdiv Province, Bulgaria
 Réunion, France
 Rio de Janeiro, Brazil
 Saarland, Germany
 Sarajevo, Bosnia and Herzegovina
 Ulaanbaatar, Mongolia
 Yokkaichi, Japan

Tongling

 Antofagasta, Chile
 Halton, England, United Kingdom

 Skellefteå, Sweden

U
Ürümqi

 Almaty, Kazakhstan
 Antalya, Turkey
 Aqaba, Jordan
 Batumi, Georgia
 Bishkek, Kyrgyzstan
 Chelyabinsk, Russia
 Dushanbe, Tajikistan
 Karachi, Pakistan
 Klang, Malaysia
 Mashhad, Iran
 Narrandera, Australia
 Omsk, Russia
 Orem, United States

 Peshawar, Pakistan

W
Weihai

 Biella, Italy
 Cheltenham, England, United Kingdom

 Nampo, North Korea
 Santa Barbara, United States
 Sochi, Russia
 Sousse, Tunisia
 Timaru, New Zealand
 Ube, Japan
 Yeosu, South Korea

Weinan

 Komsomolsk-on-Amur, Russia
 Szeged, Hungary

Wenzhou

 Alicante, Spain
 Alsergrund (Vienna), Austria
 Ambato, Ecuador
 Giessen, Germany
 Gumi, South Korea
 Ipswich, Australia
 Ipswich, England, United Kingdom
 Ishinomaki, Japan
 Kumasi, Ghana
 Kure, Japan
 Lucknow, India
 Port-Gentil, Gabon
 Prato Province, Italy
 Slagelse, Denmark
 Union County, United States
 Vallensbæk, Denmark
 Walvis Bay, Namibia

Wuhan

 Ashdod, Israel
 Bangkok, Thailand
 Bishkek, Kyrgyzstan
 Bordeaux, France

 Chalcis, Greece
 Cheongju, South Korea
 Christchurch, New Zealand
 Concepción, Chile
 Duisburg, Germany
 Entebbe, Uganda
 Essonne, France
 Galați, Romania
 Győr, Hungary
 Izhevsk, Russia
 İzmir, Turkey
 Khartoum, Sudan
 Kyiv, Ukraine
 Kópavogur, Iceland
 Manchester, England, United Kingdom
 Markham, Canada
 Ōita, Japan
 Pittsburgh, United States
 Sankt Pölten, Austria
 Saratov, Russia
 Swansea, Wales, United Kingdom
 Tijuana, Mexico

Wuhu

 Kōchi, Japan
 Torrejón de Ardoz, Spain
 Ulyanovsk, Russia

Wuxi

 Akashi, Japan
 Cascais, Portugal
 Chattanooga, United States
 Chelmsford, England, United Kingdom
 Fez, Morocco
 Frankston, Australia
 Fredericton, Canada
 Gimhae, South Korea
 Hamilton, New Zealand
 Lahti, Finland
 Leverkusen, Germany
 Patras, Greece
 Puebla, Mexico
 Puerto Princesa, Philippines
 Sagamihara, Japan
 San Antonio, United States
 Sihanoukville, Cambodia
 Södertälje, Sweden
 Sorocaba, Brazil
 Tiberias, Israel
 Ulsan, South Korea
 Viña del Mar, Chile
 Zielona Góra, Poland

Wuxi – Binhu

 Araçariguama, Brazil
 Castelldefels, Spain
 Matsusaka, Japan
 Norwich, United States

Wuxi – Huishan

 Davis, United States
 Ratingen, Germany
 Ulju, South Korea
 Zacatecas, Mexico

Wuxi – Xinwu
 Toyokawa, Japan

Wuxi – Xishan
 West Orange, United States

X
Xi'an

 Brasília, Brazil
 Córdoba, Argentina
 Cuenca, Ecuador
 Dnipro, Ukraine
 Dortmund, Germany
 Edinburgh, Scotland, United Kingdom
 Ercolano, Italy
 Fez, Morocco
 Funabashi, Japan
 Groningen, Netherlands
 Gyeongju, South Korea
 Gyumri, Armenia

 Iași, Romania
 Isfahan, Iran
 Jinju, South Korea
 Kalamata, Greece
 Kansas City, United States
 Kathmandu, Nepal
 Konya, Turkey
 Kotor, Montenegro
 Kragujevac, Serbia
 Kyoto, Japan
 Lahore, Pakistan
 Mary, Turkmenistan
 Montgomery County, United States
 Multan, Pakistan
 Nara, Japan
 Oldenburg, Germany
 Osh, Kyrgyzstan
 Pau, France
 Pompei, Italy
 Quebec City, Canada
 Samarkand, Uzbekistan

 Valencia, Spain

Xiamen

 Baltimore, United States
 Cardiff, Wales, United Kingdom
 Cebu City, Philippines
 Dushanbe, Tajikistan
 Guadalajara, Mexico
 İzmir, Turkey
 Kaunas, Lithuania
 Marathon, Greece
 Mokpo, South Korea
 Nice, France
 Penang Island, Malaysia
 Phuket, Thailand
 Richmond, Canada
 Sasebo, Japan
 Sunshine Coast, Australia
 Surabaya, Indonesia
 Trier, Germany
 Wellington, New Zealand
 Zoetermeer, Netherlands

Xiamen – Siming
 Sarasota, United States

Xianyang

 Le Mans, France
 Moreland, Australia
 Narita, Japan
 Rochester, United States
 Uiseong, South Korea
 Uji, Japan

Xining

 Antalya, Turkey
 Edirne, Turkey
 Izhevsk, Russia
 Jung (Daejeon), South Korea
 Lalitpur, Nepal
 Osh, Kyrgyzstan
 Utah County, United States

Xinxiang

 Itajaí, Brazil
 Kashiwara, Japan

Xuancheng
 Shikokuchūō, Japan

Xuzhou

 Érd, Hungary
 Erfurt, Germany
 Greater Dandenong, Australia
 Handa, Japan
 Jeongeup, South Korea
 Leoben, Austria
 Mežica, Slovenia
 Newark, United States
 Osasco, Brazil
 Ryazan, Russia
 Saint-Étienne, France

Y
Yangquan

 Chesterfield, England, United Kingdom
 Pleven, Bulgaria
 Ratchaburi, Thailand

Yangzhou

 Atsugi, Japan
 Attleboro, United States
 Balashikha, Russia
 Breda, Netherlands
 Colchester, England, United Kingdom
 Karatsu, Japan
 Kent, United States
 Konya, Turkey
 Korčula, Croatia
 Luxor, Egypt
 Nara, Japan
 Neubrandenburg, Germany
 Offenbach am Main, Germany
 Orléans, France
 Rimini, Italy
 Southern Grampians, Australia
 Vaughan, Canada
 Vlorë, Albania
 Westport, United States
 Yangon, Myanmar
 Yongin, South Korea

Yantai

 Alcalá de Henares, Spain
 Angers, France
 Angus, Scotland, United Kingdom
 Beppu, Japan
 Burgas, Bulgaria
 Gunsan, South Korea
 Isaac, Australia
 Kingston, Jamaica
 Mackay, Australia
 Miskolc, Hungary
 Omaha, United States

 Phuket, Thailand
 Quimper, France
 San Diego, United States
 Szombathely, Hungary
 Tauranga, New Zealand
 Whitsunday, Australia

Yantai – Penglai

 Cartaxo, Portugal
 Leiria, Portugal
 Salaberry-de-Valleyfield, Canada

 Sonoma, United States

Yibin
 Columbia, United States

Yichang

 Foz do Iguaçu, Brazil
 Třebíč, Czech Republic
 Valenciennes, France
 Washington County, United States
 Zaporizhzhia, Ukraine

Yichun

 Azuga, Romania
 Bad Wildungen, Germany
 Birobidzhan, Russia
 Camrose, Canada

Yinchuan

 Bourg-en-Bresse, France
 Bishkek, Kyrgyzstan
 Eilat, Israel
 İlkadım, Turkey
 Matsue, Japan
 Montana, Bulgaria
 Outapi, Namibia
 Port Vila, Vanuatu
 Settat, Morocco
 Ulaanbaatar, Mongolia

Yixing

 Hayward, United States
 Mungyeong, South Korea
 Novo Mesto, Slovenia
 Sanford, United States

Yueyang

 Akabira, Japan
 Castlegar, Canada
 Cockburn, Australia
 Numazu, Japan
 Stara Zagora, Bulgaria
 Titusville, United States

Yuyao

 Hitachiōta, Japan

 Walnut, United States

Z
Zhangjiagang

 Glenelg, Australia
 Marshfield, United States
 Marugame, Japan
 Redondo Beach, United States
 Vyazma, Russia

Zhangzhou

 Date, Japan
 Gödöllő, Hungary
 Honolulu, United States
 Isahaya, Japan
 Palembang, Indonesia
 Wageningen, Netherlands

Zhanjiang

 Atlantic City, United States
 Cairns, Australia
 Greater Geraldton, Australia
 iLembe, South Africa
 Samborondón, Ecuador
 Serpukhov, Russia

Zhengzhou

 Cluj-Napoca, Romania
 Irbid, Jordan
 Joinville, Brazil
 Mariental, Namibia
 Mogilev, Belarus
 Ouagadougou, Burkina Faso
 Richmond, United States
 Saitama, Japan
 Samara, Russia
 Shumen, Bulgaria

Zhenjiang

 Bergerac (communauté), France
 Fairfield, Australia
 Iksan, South Korea
 Kiskőrös, Hungary
 Kurashiki, Japan
 Londrina, Brazil
 Mannheim, Germany
 Mikhaylovsk, Russia
 Seo (Busan), South Korea
 Shibata, Japan
 Stavropol, Russia
 Tempe, United States
 Tsu, Japan

Zhongshan

 Alameda County, United States
 Burnaby, Canada
 Culiacán, Mexico
 Honolulu, United States
 Puntarenas, Costa Rica

Zhuhai

 Atami, Japan
 Braunschweig, Germany
 Castelo Branco, Portugal
 Gold Coast, Australia
 Gwadar District, Pakistan
 Halifax, Canada
 Luganville, Vanuatu
 Providence, United States
 Redwood City, United States
 La Spezia, Italy
 Surrey, Canada
 Vitória, Brazil
 Zhukovsky, Russia

Zibo

 Bergamo Province, Italy
 Bratsk, Russia
 Erie, United States
 Kamo, Japan
 Mandaue, Philippines
 Newcastle, South Africa
 São José dos Pinhais, Brazil
 Veliky Novgorod, Russia

Zigong
 Goseong, South Korea

References

China
Lists of cities in China
Foreign relations of China
China geography-related lists
Populated places in China